Sphaeroderma testaceum, the artichoke beetle, is a species of flea beetles in the family Chrysomelidae.

Distribution
This species is present in most of Europe, North Africa and Israel. It is adventive in Northern America (Atlantic Canada),

Habitat
These beetles mainly inhabit wasteland, woodland, roadsides and other areas where host plants occur.

Description

These tiny beetles have a wide head, large eyes and the filiform antennae are close together between the eyes. Elytra are convex and slightly elongate and hind femora are rather enlarged. The pronotum shows coarse puncturation basally, prominent anterior corners, a well defined basal groove and two lateral notches. Elytra and pronotum are shiny light brown-orange.

This species is very similar to Sphaeroderma rubidum (Graëlls, 1853). It can be distinguished from the previous one on the basis of a smaller size and quadrate elytra, but especially with a close study of the genitalia.

Biology
Adults can be found from May/June to September. Pupation occurs in the spring and new adults may be seen from May. Overwintering occurs as 3rd (final) instar larvae, sometimes as imago.

Both larvae and adults feed on leaves, especially on various species of Thistle (Carduus, Carlina, Cirsium, Onopordum and Cynara species), on Common Knapweed (Centaurea nigra), on Serratula species and on Cirsium arvense (in Canada).

Bibliography
 Anderson, R., Nash, R. & O'Connor, J.P.. 1997, Irish Coleoptera: a revised and annotated list, Irish Naturalists' Journal Special Entomological Supplement, 1-81
 du Chatenet, G, 2000, Coléoptères Phytophages D’Europe, NAP Editions,
 Johnson, F.W & Halbert, J.N, 1902, A list of the Beetles of Ireland, Proceedings of the Royal Irish Academy, 6B: 535-827
 Joy, N.H., 1932, A practical handbook of British beetles, H.F. & G. Witherby,

References

Alticini
Beetles described in 1775
Taxa named by Johan Christian Fabricius